The Loveless (originally titled Breakdown) is a 1981 American outlaw biker drama film written and directed by Kathryn Bigelow and Monty Montgomery, the feature film directorial debut of both directors. It is an independent film and stars Willem Dafoe and musician Robert Gordon, who also did the music for the film.  The film has been compared to The Wild One.

Plot
A motorcycle gang of greasers becomes involved in trouble in a small southern town.

The group of bikers congregate at a rural roadside diner and gas station en route to Daytona. Their stay in town is extended as one of them, Hurley, has to fix his motorcycle which should take upwards of a day. The owners of the diner and gas station are nervous and one of the customers, Tarver (J. Don Ferguson), seems to be violently resentful toward them. The bikers hang around the garage, tinkering with their bikes, playing chicken with switch-blades, drinking, dancing and so on. A teenage girl named Telena, who is Tarver's daughter, arrives in a red open-topped Corvette. Vance (Willem Dafoe), one of the bikers, talks to her and they go for a drive, buying beers and whiskey for the rest of the gang. Vance and Telena go to a motel room where they have sex. As they are about to leave, they are disturbed by gun shots outside. It is Tarver, who spotted her car, and in a typical fit of anger decided to shoot out the car tires in order to punish her. He breaks into the room and takes Telena with him. Some of the other bikers, in a chance encounter, run Tarver's car off the road, causing him to crash his car. Telena is injured in the accident.

Later in the evening, the gang is in a local bar. Augusta, one of the waitresses from the diner who is bored with life in town, performs a striptease dance and the male customers of the bar become a little feverish. While in the men's room of the bar, Tarver convinces Sid, his brother, to join him in ambushing and killing the bikers later along the road, that despite Tarver having earlier "earnestly" congratulated Vance for the sexual encounter with Telena as fulfilling the needs of a man. Ricky, one of the bikers, goes to the bathroom to use the urinal, and Tarver, sensing an opportunity, attacks Ricky with his pants down. The struggle spills out into the bar where the violence escalates and gun shots ring out. Tarver is shot, and as the confusion in the bar reigns, the assumption is that the bikers have shot him in revenge, but it is Telena who has shot her father in response to his lifelong abuse of her and her mother, who committed suicide in that abuse. Further gun-shots are fired.

Outside, Vance stands smoking and sees Telena, now in the driver seat of her car, proceed to use the same pistol to shoot herself dead. The bikers quietly get on their motorcycles as they ride out of town.

Cast
Willem Dafoe as Vance
Marin Kanter as Telena
Robert Gordon as Davis
J. Don Ferguson as Tarver 
 Tina L'Hotsky as Sportster Debbie (credited as Tina L'hotsky)
 Lawrence Matarese as La Ville
 Danny Rosen as Ricky
 Phillip Kimbrough as Hurley
 Ken Call as Buck
 Elizabeth Gans as Augusta
 Margaret Jo Lee as Evie
 John King as John
 Bob Hannah as Sid

Production
Production on The Loveless began on  September 22, 1980 and the entire shoot took just 22 days. The resources of MoMA's Film Study Center were utilised by Bigelow to create the aesthetic of the film. The title of the film changed twice, originally titled U.S 17, then Breakdown, then The Loveless.

Reception
The review aggregator website Rotten Tomatoes reported that 73% of critics have given the film a positive review based on 11 reviews, with an average rating of 6.3/10. On Metacritic, the film has a weighted average score of 44 out of 100 based on 5 critics, indicating "mixed or average reviews".

See also 
1982 in film
United States in the 1950s
Outlaw motorcycle club

References

External links

Trailer
Film Forum

1981 films
Atlantic Entertainment Group films
Films directed by Kathryn Bigelow
Motorcycling films
American drama films
Outlaw biker films
Films set in the 1950s
American independent films
1981 directorial debut films
1980s English-language films
1980s American films
1981 independent films